Hein Frode Hansen (born 25 March 1972 in Haugesund) is a Norwegian heavy metal drummer. He was the original vocalist of the power metal band Serpent, formed in 1989. In 1990 he started playing drums in the death metal band Phobia. Both bands broke up in 1991. From 1993-2010 he co-founded and played in Theatre of Tragedy, and with them  released seven studio albums, two live albums and several studio EP's. Hansen has started a new project with Kristian Sigland, called The Black Locust Project.

Discography

With Serpent
Have a Nice Day - Demo (1990)
Promotion Tape 1991 - Demo (1991)

With Phobia
Feverish Convulsions - Demo (1991)

With Theatre of Tragedy
Theatre of Tragedy - Demo (1994)
Theatre of Tragedy (1995)
Velvet Darkness They Fear (1996)
A Rose for the Dead - EP (1997)
Aégis (1998)
Musique (2000)
Closure: Live - Live (2001)
Inperspective - Compilation EP (2001)
Assembly (2002)
Two Originals - Compilation (2003)
Storm (2006)
Forever Is the World(2009)
Addenda - EP (2010)
Last Curtain Call - Live (2011)

Singles
"Der Tanz der Schatten" (1996)
"Cassandra" (1998)
"Image" (2000)
"Machine" (2001)
"Let You Down" (2002)
"Envision" (2002)
"Storm" (2006)
"Deadland" (2009)

External links
Hein Frode Hansen at Theatre of Tragedy's official website

1972 births
Living people
Norwegian heavy metal drummers
Male drummers
Musicians from Haugesund
Theatre of Tragedy members
21st-century Norwegian drummers